Nyassachromis breviceps is a species of cichlid endemic to Lake Malawi where it is only found in the southern part of the lake.  It prefers areas with sandy substrates but needs a supply of small pebbles for nest building.  This species can reach a length of  TL. This species was last observed in Lake Malawi in 1997 and is thought that it may be extinct, caused by overexploitation by artisanal fishermen.

References

breviceps
Fish of Lake Malawi
Fish of Malawi
Fish described in 1922
Taxonomy articles created by Polbot